Mining in Portugal is regulated by the Portuguese Ministry of Economy and the Geology and Energy Resources authority under the state-run research institute INETI. Mining activities have continued since the pre-Roman era, when most of the region was known as Lusitania. Gold was once mined. The country remains among the largest European producers of copper and minerals.

Tin, tungsten and uranium are some of its other mineral resources. However, the country lacks hydrocarbon exploration potential, as well as iron, aluminium or coal. The most prominent mines in the country are Neves-Corvo, Panasqueira and Mua.

References